Berengarius of Namur (born circa 875 - 946) was mentioned in 908 as count of the Lommegau, that would afterwards become the county of Namur. The origins of Berengar are unknown. He supposedly married a daughter of the count of Hainaut, Reginar I.

Sources
 European Nobility

Counts of Namur
Year of death unknown
Year of birth unknown
Year of birth uncertain